Basketball competitions at the 2023 Pan American Games in Santiago, Chile are schedule to take place between October 22 and November 4, 2023 at the Multisport Complex 1 (5x5) and South Sports Centre (3x3) Both venues are located in the National Stadium Park cluster.

A total of eight men's and women's teams will each contest the 5x5 tournaments, meanwhile, 12 teams each will contest the 3x3 tournaments, doubling the size of the fields from 2019.

Qualification

Men's five-a-side

Women's five-a-side

Men's 3x3

Women's 3x3

Medal summary

Medal table

Medalists

See also
Basketball at the 2024 Summer Olympics

References

Basketball at the 2023
Events at the 2023 Pan American Games
Pan American Games
2023